The Mongolian Hockey Federation is the governing body of ice hockey in Mongolia. It controls the six team national league in Mongolia, as well as the Mongolian national ice hockey team, whose first appearance in an IIHF event was the 2007 IIHF World Championship Division III tournament. They have since taken part in the 2008 IIHF World Championship Division III. In October 2012, their last appearance was the 2013 IIHF World Championship Division III Qualification in Abu Dhabi, United Arab Emirates.

References 

 NHL.com article on Mongolian ice hockey
 Mongolian Hockey Federation, Courtesy of Beijing International

External links 
 Mongolia at IIHF.com
 Beijing International work with Mongolian Hockey Federation

International Ice Hockey Federation members
Ice hockey governing bodies in Asia
Ice
Ice hockey in Mongolia